The Cuchilla de Caraguatá is a range of hills in Uruguay.

Location

It is situated in Uruguay's largest department, Tacuarembó Department, in the north of the country.

Name

The range of hills gives its name to a village formerly known as Cuchilla de Caraguatá.

The word 'Caraguatá' originally referred to a local plant.

A nearby river is named the Caraguatá River.

Featured in literature

'Caraguatá' is featured in the poetry of a local writer, Circe Maia. Maia has written a series of poems entitled 'Poemas de Caraguatá', containing reflections to which local topography, flora and fauna have given rise.

See also

 Circe Maia#Regional background

References

Hills of Uruguay
Landforms of Tacuarembó Department